Freshwater Christian College is a private Christian school located in the suburb of Brinsmead, in Cairns, in Far North Queensland, Australia.

It is a co-educational private school with a Queensland accredited Kindergarten and grades Prep to Year 12.

References

External links
 Freshwater Christian College

Nondenominational Christian schools in Queensland
High schools in Queensland
Schools in Cairns